The 2012 Holy Cross Crusaders football team represented the College of the Holy Cross in the 2012 NCAA Division I FCS football season. They were led by ninth-year head coach Tom Gilmore and played their home games at Fitton Field. They are a member of the Patriot League. They finished the season 2–9, 2–4 in Patriot League play to finish in a three way tie for third place.

Schedule

References

Holy Cross
Holy Cross Crusaders football seasons
Holy Cross Crusaders football